Henry Lucas is the name of:
 Henry Lucas (baseball) (1857–1910), American baseball executive and owner of the St. Louis Maroons
 Henry Lucas (politician) (c. 1610–1663), English MP, philanthropist and benefactor to Cambridge University
 Henry Lucas, British car enthusiast, associated with James and Browne automobiles
 Henry Lee Lucas (1936–2001), American convicted serial killer

See also
Lucas (surname)
Lucas (disambiguation)